Georgiyevka is a rural locality (a selo) in Belovsky Selsoviet, Rebrikhinsky District, Altai Krai, Russia. The population was 542 as of 2013. There are 13 streets.

Geography 
Georgiyevka is located 37 km southwest of Rebrikha (the district's administrative centre) by road. Belovo and Pokrovka are the nearest rural localities.

References 

Rural localities in Rebrikhinsky District